Roesler is a red Austrian wine grape developed in 1970 by Dr. Gertraud Mayer at Höhere Bundeslehranstalt und das Bundesamt für Wein- und Obstbau in Klosterneuburg, Austria. It is the result of a crossing Zweigelt x (Seyve-Villard 18-402 x Blaufränkisch). 
It is named after the former director of Austria's oldest viticultural college, Leonard Roesler (1839–1910), who was a German-Austrian chemist and oenologist. The variety is deep in colour and with abundant extract. It is frost resistant and can withstand temperatures as low as -25ºC (-13ºF). It is also resistant to mildew.

References

External links
 Grape varieties in Austria: Roesler  Wines from Austria
 Höhere Bundeslehranstalt und das Bundesamt für Wein- und Obstbau in Klosterneuburg
 Vitis International Variety Catalogue

Red wine grape varieties